Reticulon-1 also known as neuroendocrine-specific protein (NSP) is a protein that in humans is encoded by the RTN1 gene.

This gene belongs to the family of reticulon-encoding genes. Reticulons are associated with the endoplasmic reticulum, and are involved in neuroendocrine secretion or in membrane trafficking in neuroendocrine cells. Alternatively spliced transcript variants encoding different isoforms have been identified. Multiple promoters rather than alternative splicing of internal exons seem to be involved in this diversity.

Interactions 

RTN1 has been shown to interact with BCL2-like 1 and UGCG.

References

Further reading